Tongzhi (Wade-Giles: T'ung-chih) can refer to:
 Tongzhi Emperor (1856–1875, reigned 1861–1875) of the Qing dynasty
Tongzhi Restoration (c. 1860–1874), an attempt to strengthen the late Qing dynasty
Tongzhi porcelain, a Chinese porcelain from Tongzhi Emperor's reign
 Tongzhi (encyclopedia), an 1161 Chinese encyclopaedia by Zheng Qiao
 Tongzhi (term), a term that could mean either "comrade" or "homosexual" in modern Chinese language